The Evans formula was the first burn resuscitation formula based on body surface area damage and body weight, described in 1952. It was the standard burn care formula for years.

Formula 
Evans formula: normal saline at 1 ml/kg/% TBSA burn " colloid at 1 ml/kg/% TBSA burn. For second 24 hours, give half of the first 24-hour requirements " D5W (dextrose 5% in water) 2000 ml.

References

Emergency medical procedures